Jovan Talevski (born 18 September 1994) is a Macedonian handball player who plays for TV 1878 Homburg.

References
https://web.archive.org/web/20160926213051/http://24rakomet.mk/?p=35836
https://www.gol.mk/rakomet/talevski-si-zamina-od-turcija-i-potpisha-za-klub-od-bih

1994 births
Living people
Macedonian male handball players
Sportspeople from Skopje